Jangam refers to a Shaiva order of wandering religious monks. Jangam may also refer to:

Jangam station, northern terminus of the Seoul Subway Line 7
Bharat Jangam (born 1947) Nepali novelist and freelance journalist